"Μia Zografia (O Kosmos Mas)" is a song by Greek singer Demy and Midenistis. It was released as a digital download in Greece on 11 July 2011 as the lead single from her debut studio album #1 (2012).

Music video
A music video to accompany the release of "Μia Zografia" was first released onto YouTube on 8 July 2011 at a total length of three minutes and fifty-six seconds.

Track listing

Release history

References

2011 songs
2011 singles